is a splashed-ink landscape painting on a hanging scroll. It was made by the Japanese artist Sesshū Tōyō in 1495, in the Muromachi period. The ink wash painting is classified as a National Treasure of Japan and currently held by the Tokyo National Museum.

Overview
 was a Zen Buddhist monk and painter. The monochromatic style can result in artworks similar to calligraphy. In this style, the painter avoids strongly defined outlines, with shapes indicated by colour washes in lighter and darker tones.  

The work slowly reveals itself to the viewer. Emerging from the undefined forms is the suggestion of misty mountains in the background. In the foreground are cliffs and bushes, and the triangular roofline and sloping banner for a wine shop with vertical lines forming a fence. Below is indicated the flat surface of a body of water, with two people to the right in a rowing boat.

The scroll measures . It bears a dedicatory inscription by the artist, dating it to the middle of the third month in the fourth year of the Meiō era (that is, April or May 1495), when Sesshū was aged 76. It was presented to Sesshū's pupil Josui Sōen, at his request, as a physical demonstration that he had studied under Sesshū in Suō Province (now in Yamaguchi Prefecture). As an indication of the artistic heritage passed on to his pupil, Sesshū wrote on the scroll that he had travelled to China where he said he had studied the works of Li Zai and Zhang Yousheng, and had studied in Japan with Tensho Shubun, who was a pupil of Taikō Josetsu. It is unlikely that he actually met Li Zai, however, as the latter died a considerable time before Sesshū's visit to China.
 
On his journey home to Engaku-ji in Kamakura, Josui Sōen stopped in Kyoto, where he asked six Zen Buddhist monks from Gozan temples to add poems to the scroll. A similar work by Sesshū is currently held by the Cleveland Museum of Art, and another is preserved at the Idemitsu Museum of Arts in Tokyo.

Gallery

See also
 List of National Treasures of Japan (paintings)

Notes

References
 Landscape.  Inscription by the artist et al. , Tokyo National Museum
 Landscape with broken ink, e-Museum
 Haboku-Sansui (Landscape with ink broken), theartwolf.com
 Haboku, Splashed Ink Landscape, Cleveland Museum of Art
 Lecture Notes, by James Cahill, Institute of East Asian Studies, University of California, Berkeley
 CLP 120: 1995 “Two Snowy Peaks Viewed from Afar: Some Chinese Thoughts on Sesshu and Sesson.”, LACMA lecture, Dec. 3,1995:

1490s in Japan
1495 in Asia
1495 paintings
Japanese paintings
Muromachi-period works
National Treasures of Japan
Paintings in the collection of the Tokyo National Museum
Zen art and culture